Václav Kozák (14 April 1937 – 15 March 2004) was a Czech rower who competed for Czechoslovakia at the 1960, 1964 and 1968 Olympics. In 1960, he won the gold medal in double sculls together with Pavel Schmidt. In 1964 and 1968 he placed 12th and 9th in the single sculls, respectively. At the European championships Kozák won four medals in various events between 1959 and 1965, including a gold in single sculls in 1963. The same year he was named Czechoslovak athlete of the year.

Kozák started as a cyclist, and changed to rowing in 1952 motivated by the gold medal of the Czech coxed fours at the 1952 Olympics. In 1955 he won a national junior title in single skulls, and in 1957 won his first national senior title; he later added 14 more in various disciplines. After retiring from competitions he worked as a rowing coach at the Dukla club in Prague, raising several world championship and Olympic medalists. He was also a military officer and retired in 1991 as lieutenant colonel. In his later life he developed an addiction to alcohol and became homeless for a while. He died aged 66.

References

1937 births
2004 deaths
Czech male rowers
Czechoslovak male rowers
Olympic rowers of Czechoslovakia
Rowers at the 1960 Summer Olympics
Rowers at the 1964 Summer Olympics
Rowers at the 1968 Summer Olympics
Olympic gold medalists for Czechoslovakia
Olympic medalists in rowing
Medalists at the 1960 Summer Olympics
People from Louny District
European Rowing Championships medalists
Sportspeople from the Ústí nad Labem Region